Tai Shui Hang is an MTR station on the  in Hong Kong. It serves residential estates including Kam Tai Court, Mountain Shore, Chevalier Garden and Sausalito, Tai Shui Hang Village and Sha Tin Fishermen's New Village. It also serves five kindergartens, primary and secondary schools. The pattern featured on the platform pillar and glass barrier is a shot of nature representing the Ma On Shan Country Park. For a period before the line opened, the station was known as "Fu On", since it is located opposite Chevalier Garden (transliterated from Chinese "Fu On Garden").

History 
On 21 December 2004, Tai Shui Hang station opened to the public with the other KCR Ma On Shan Rail stations.

The Ma On Shan Line was renamed Tuen Ma Line Phase 1 at the time. Tai Shui Hang station became an intermediate station on this temporary new line. 

Hence, Tai Shui Hang was included in the project and is now an intermediate station on the Tuen Ma line, Hong Kong's longest railway line.

Station layout

Platforms 1 and 2 share the same island platform.

Entrances/exits
A: Kam Tai Court 
B: Chevalier Garden

References

MTR stations in the New Territories
Ma On Shan line
Tuen Ma line
Tai Shui Hang
Former Kowloon–Canton Railway stations
Railway stations in Hong Kong opened in 2004